Travis Janssen is an American college baseball coach and former second baseman. Janssen played college baseball at New Mexico State from 1995 to 1995, before playing professionally. He then served as the head coach of the Northeastern State (2012–2015) and the Austin Peay Govenors (2016–2022).

Playing career
Janssen attended Manhattan High School in Manhattan, Kansas. Janssen was on the second ever Manhattan baseball team, and helped lead the team to a state championship as a senior in 1992. Janssen then committed to Butler Community College, where he was a member of the Butler Grizzles baseball team. After two seasons at Butler, Janssen transferred to New Mexico State University where he continued his baseball career.

Coaching career
Janssen served as a graduate assistant with the Kansas State Wildcats baseball program in 1997. In 1998, he moved on to Butler where he spent a season. In 1999, he joined the Arkansas Razorbacks baseball team as an assistant.

On June 29, 2011, Janssen was named the head coach of the Northeastern State University baseball team.

On September 16, 2015, Janssen was named the head coach of the Austin Peay Governors baseball program. On April 25, 2022, Janssen was relieved of his duties as head coach of the Governors.

Head coaching record

References

External links

Northeastern State RiverHawks bio
Austin Peay Governors bio

Living people
1974 births
Baseball second basemen
Butler Grizzlies baseball players
New Mexico State Aggies baseball players
Adirondack Lumberjacks players
Kansas State Wildcats baseball coaches
Butler Grizzlies baseball coaches
Arkansas Razorbacks baseball coaches
Northwestern State Demons baseball coaches
Hawaii Rainbow Warriors baseball coaches
Jacksonville State Gamecocks baseball coaches
Northeastern State RiverHawks baseball coaches
Austin Peay Governors baseball coaches
Kansas State University alumni
Baseball coaches from Kansas
Sportspeople from Manhattan, Kansas